Hang Seng may refer to:
 Hang Seng Bank, a bank in Hong Kong
 Stock market indices by Hang Seng Bank for companies listed on the Stock Exchange of Hong Kong:
 Hang Seng Index, the major index reflecting stock market performance in Hong Kong
 Hang Seng China Enterprises Index
 Hang Seng China-Affiliated Corporations Index
 Hang Seng Composite Index Series
 Stock market indices by Hang Seng Bank
 Hang Seng China 50 Index
 Hang Seng School of Commerce, a school in Hong Kong